Dundonald High School is a controlled co-educational secondary school located in Dundonald, a suburb of Belfast in Northern Ireland. The school opened in the early-1970s and offers education to 11 to 16-year-olds.

Students come from the Dundonald area, Bangor, Newtownards, Holywood, Comber, Gilnahirk and Belfast. Students of all ethnic, religious backgrounds and country origins are welcomed, with students from countries such as Portugal, Hungary, Bangladesh and Estonia have attended the school.

The school badge is similar to the County Down coat of arms with the motto "Absque Labore Nihil" which translates to "Nothing Without Labour" in Latin. The school is ran under the South Eastern Education and Library Board (SEELB).

The school is located on the Upper Newtownards Road. The River Enler runs beside the school. Dundonald High School is partnered with Presentation College Headford, in County Galway, Ireland.

The school offers a wide range of subjects that include: English, mathematics, home economics, music, technology, art and design, French, Spanish, geography, history, OCN Well-being, Prince's Trust, learning for life and work, science, horticulture, business studies, physical education and information and communications technology. These subjects (excluding compulsory English, maths and science) are made available to Key Stage 4 level students to choose from. Regulated Qualifications Framework (RQF) is the qualification framework used. The GCSE-level or level 1 and 2 qualifications are awarded from CCEA, Edexcel, Essential Skills, Key Skills, AQA, BTEC and Open College Network (OCN) education boards. Extra qualification and learning events come from Young Enterprise.

The high school runs an annual celebration of success programme, awarding students for their efforts and achievements throughout the school year. The programme exhibits a range of musical performances throughout. Parents and special guests attend, such as local primary principals, volunteers and community workers.

History 
In the 20th century, Dundonald saw two separate high schools, Dundonald girls high school and Dundonald boys high school. After many decades the two schools amalgamated into one mixed-gender school in 1990 in hopes of attracting more pupils.

In 2012, Sinn Féin member John O'Dowd made a proposal to close Dundonald High School, as well as the proposal to close Orangefield High School, due to low pupil numbers and for financial reasons. The community of Dundonald, students, parents and school staff fought hard for two years to keep the school open. UUP party leader Mike Nesbitt fought to keep Dundonald High School open. In 2014, Orangefield closed permanently, with the overwhelming decision in Stormont that Dundonald High School would remain open. The acting principal, Ken Perry was strongly proud and thankful for the final decision. Mr. Perry was a past pupil of the school who went on to become the full-time principal of Dundonald High School. His main aim was to increase the number of students within the school. Enrollment numbers began to rise, with a maximum 100 pupils entering year 8 in 2016. Along with this, saw the GCSE grades rise to record-breaking heights for the school.

In 2015, the Dundonald High School Bowls team were Runners-up in the Irish Bowls Federation Competition. In November, the Senior Girls' Rugby team won the Castlereagh and Lisburn Rugby Blitz competition at Lisnagarvey playing fields.

In 2016, the school was refurbished and modernised and saw the introduction of educational iPads.

House system 
In 2015, the school introduced a house system where pupils were put into one of three houses, in which are named after genera of plants. These have been planted at the school gates by school students along with DUP MLA's including Gavin Robinson. Students can earn points for their respective house based on strong attendance and valiant work efforts and contributions to the school. The awards include prizes and school trips. The houses are represented in teams on events such as sports day and rounders day in which they collect points for their house. The three houses are:

Sports 

 Aerobics
 Badminton
 Basketball
 Bowls
 Cricket
 Dodgeball
 Football
 Gymnastics
 High jump
 Hoopla
 Hockey
 Long jump
 Netball
 Rounders
 Running
 Rugby union
 Tennis
 Track and field
 Volleyball

Extracurricular activities 

Art club
Band
Bass, Electric and Acoustic Guitar lessons
Breakfast club
Board games club
 Choir
 Dance
Drum lessons
ICT club
Library
Maths club
Piano lessons
Pool (cue sports)
Science club
 Sponsored walk
Student council
Table Tennis
Tin Whistle lessons
 Trivia
Voluntary work

Notable alumni 

Colin Murray - BBC Sports, music radio, and television presenter.
David Jeffrey - Former Linfield and Northern Ireland football player and Manager.
Gareth Wright - Local council member, Comber Greenway Head Campaigist and Anti-bullying activist.
Juliette McCutcheon - Tuba player, Newtownards Silver Band member and BBC Radio Ulster Band Series musician.
Ken Perry - Principal of Dundonald High School, degree in Music.
Lewis Nickell - BBC Three chat show host with Tourette's Syndrome - "What makes you tic?".
Ryan Annett - DJ and radio presenter on Q Radio and Cool FM.

See also 
 List of schools in Northern Ireland
 List of secondary schools in Northern Ireland

External links 

Official website
Education Authority Profile
Facebook Page
Twitter Account

References

Secondary schools in Belfast
Protestant schools
Educational institutions established in the 1970s